Graciela María de los Dolores González Farías is a Mexican statistician whose research involves multivariate analysis, time series, and the estimation of shape parameters of skewed data. She is a researcher at the Centro de Investigación en Matemáticas (CIMAT), the director of CIMAT's branch campus in Monterrey, Mexico, and a former president of the Asociación Mexicana de Estadística (Mexican Statistical Association).

Education and career
González studied mathematics at the Autonomous University of Nuevo León, where she earned a bachelor's degree in 1979. Her doctoral dissertation, A New Unit Root Test for Autoregressive Time Series, was jointly supervised by David Dickey and Peter Bloomfield.

She became a researcher at CIMAT in 1999, and was named director of CIMAT Monterrey in 2010. She served as president of the Mexican Statistical Association for the 2005–2007 term.

Recognition
González is an elected member of the International Statistical Institute.

References

External links

Year of birth missing (living people)
Living people
Mexican statisticians
Women statisticians
Autonomous University of Nuevo León alumni
North Carolina State University alumni
Elected Members of the International Statistical Institute